Mırtı, Myrty, or Mirti may refer to:

Mırtı, Agsu, Azerbaijan
Mırtı, Goychay, Azerbaijan
Mirti (Rome Metro), a railway station in Rome, Italy